Michigan's 35th Senate district is one of 38 districts in the Michigan Senate. The 35th district was created with the adoption of the 1963 Michigan Constitution, as the previous 1908 state constitution only permitted 34 senatorial districts. It has been represented by Democrat Kristen McDonald Rivet since 2023, succeeding Republican Curt VanderWall.

Geography
District 35 encompasses parts of Bay, Midland, and Saginaw counties.

2011 Apportionment Plan
District 35, as dictated by the 2011 Apportionment Plan, covered a large swath of Northern Michigan, which included all of Benzie, Crawford, Kalkaska, Lake, Leelanau, Manistee, Mason, Missaukee, Ogemaw, Osceola, Roscommon, and Wexford Counties. Communities within the district included Cadillac, Ludington, Manistee, Frankfort, Grayling, Kalkaska, Baldwin, Greilickville, Scottville, Lake City, West Branch, Reed City, Evart, Houghton Lake, St. Helen, and Roscommon.

The district overlapped with Michigan's 1st, 2nd, and 4th congressional districts, and with the 97th, 100th, 101st, 102nd, and 103rd districts of the Michigan House of Representatives.

List of senators

Recent election results

2018

2014

Federal and statewide results in District 35

Historical district boundaries

References 

35
Benzie County, Michigan
Crawford County, Michigan
Kalkaska County, Michigan
Lake County, Michigan
Leelanau County, Michigan
Manistee County, Michigan
Mason County, Michigan
Missaukee County, Michigan
Ogemaw County, Michigan
Osceola County, Michigan
Roscommon County, Michigan
Wexford County, Michigan